Zerio is a village in Vitoria-Gasteiz, Álava in the Basque Country of Spain. 

Populated places in Álava